Ambalabe is a town and commune in northern Madagascar. It belongs to the district of Antalaha, which is a part of Sava Region. According to 2001 commune census the population of Ambalabe was 16,250.

Ambalabe has a riverine harbour.  The majority 80% of the population are farmers, while an additional 13% receives their livelihood from raising livestock. The most important crop is vanilla, while other important products are sugarcane and rice.  Services provide employment for 2% of the population. Additionally fishing employs 5% of the population.

References and notes 

Populated places in Sava Region